Live is an album by Elkie Brooks. Recorded live on tour in 1999 and 2000, it was released on CD in 2000 through JAM Records.

Since the album was only available on tour, it was not chart eligible.

Track listing 
"Nights in White Satin"
"Sail On"
"Fool If you Think Its Over"
"Besame Mucho"
"No More The fool"
"Natural Thing"
"Lilac Wine"
"Sunshine After the Rain"
"Hold On"
"Cross Roads"
"Red House"
"Baby What You Want Me to Do"
"Pearl's a Singer"
"Gasoline Alley"
"We've Got Tonight"
"Tore Down"

Personnel 
Elkie Brooks – vocals
Jean Roussel – keyboards
Brandon Fownes – Keyboards 
Al Hodge – guitar
Mike Cahen – guitar
Mike Richardson – drums
Roger Innis – bass
Arnaud Frank – percussion

Elkie Brooks albums
2000 live albums